Sreedharpasha is a village located in Kolkolia Union, Jagannathpur Upazila, Sunamganj in the division of Sylhet, Bangladesh.

Geography 
Sreedharpasha is located at the north-western part of Jagannathpur Upazila within no. 2 ward of Kolkolia Union.

Demography 
Sreedharpasha has a population of 3,190. Among them, 1,584 are males and 1,606 are females.

Administration 
Sreedharpasha constitutes the no. 2 ward of Kolkolia Union of Jagannathpur Upazila.

Education 
The educational institutions of Sreedharpasha are:
 Sreedharpasha Govt. Primary School
 Sreedharpasha Darul Uloom Madrasa

References

Villages in Jagannathpur Upazila